The Petite rivière aux Saumons (English: Little Salmons River) is a tributary of the Ashuapmushuan River, flowing in the unorganized territory of Rivière-Mistassini and in the municipality of Saint-Thomas-Didyme, in the Maria-Chapdelaine Regional County Municipality, in the administrative region of Saguenay–Lac-Saint-Jean, in the province of Quebec, in Canada.

The valley of the Petite rivière aux Saumons is mainly served by forest roads.

Forestry is the main economic activity in this valley.

Geography 
The Petite rivière aux Saumons has its source at the mouth of the lake Anita. This head lake has two emissaries: the other flows north to discharge towards Lac Chapeau which in turn flows into Petit lac à Jim.

The mouth of the lake Anita is located in a forest zone in the unorganized territory of Rivière-Mistassini, at:
  nord-est of the course of ruisseau Moncou which flows in parallel (west side) of the Petite rivière aux Saumons;
  north-west of the mouth of the Petite rivière aux Saumons;
  north-west of downtown Saint-Félicien.

  towards the south relatively in a straight line, crossing Malfait lake, up to at its mouth;
  to the south relatively in a straight line, crossing Lac de la Petite Rivière aux Saumons, up to its mouth;
  first to the south in a straight line, up to the limit of the municipality of Saint-Thomas-Didyme;
  towards the south-east, entering the Ashuapmushuan Wildlife Reserve and collecting the discharge (coming from the north-west) of Perron lake, up to a bend in the river; then on  towards the west, to its mouth.

This confluence is located at:

  to the southwest of the center of the village of Saint-Thomas-Didyme;
  north-west of downtown Saint-Félicien;
  northwest of the mouth of the Ashuapmushuan River.

Toponymy 
The toponyms "Petite rivière aux Saumons" and "Lac de la Petite Rivière aux Saumons" are interrelated.

The toponym "Petite rivière aux Saumons" was made official on September 29, 1975, at the Place Names Bank of the Commission de toponymie du Québec.

Notes and references

See also 

 Maria-Chapdelaine Regional County Municipality
 Rivière-Mistassini, an unorganized territory (Canada)
 Saint-Thomas-Didyme, a municipality
 Ashuapmushuan River
 Ashuapmushuan Wildlife Reserve
 List of rivers of Quebec

External links 
 

Rivers of Saguenay–Lac-Saint-Jean
Maria-Chapdelaine Regional County Municipality